Madeleine Attal, also known as Madeleine Attal-Charvet, (11 December 1921 – 13 January 2023) was a French actress and theatre director.

Biography
Attal began her acting career in 1945 with the Compagnie du Peyrou, before heading a drama troupe at a Montpellier radio station, where she worked as a continuity announcer and a theatre and film director. At the theatre, she staged a number of plays, such as La Pastorale des voleurs by Max Roqueta in 1960 at the Festival de Carcassonne, as well as Gaslight by Patrick Hamilton at the Salle Molière in Montpellier in 1963. She was also programming director of France 3 Sud.

Madeleine Attal died in Montaud, Hérault on 13 January 2023 at the age of 101.

Honours
Honorary citizen of Montaud, Hérault

References

1921 births
2023 deaths
Pieds-Noirs
20th-century French actresses
21st-century French actresses
French stage actresses
French centenarians
Women centenarians